The Seletar Mall (Chinese: 利达广场) is a suburban shopping mall located in Fernvale, Singapore, next to Fernvale LRT station. Construction of the mall started in late 2012 and it officially opened on 28 November 2014.

History
In August 2012, SPH and United Engineers Limited were awarded a 99-year lease of the triangular plot of land beside Fernvale LRT station and announced that a new shopping mall would be built. Jointly developed by SPH and United Engineers Limited, construction of the mall started in late 2012 and was completed by late July 2014.

In October 2013, SPH announced that it has secured 3 anchor tenants, NTUC FairPrice Finest, NTUC Foodfare and Shaw Theatres. Shaw Theatres which occupies 17,000 sq-ft of level 4, NTUC Foodfare occupies 12,000 sq-ft of level 3 (now Haidilao Hotpot) and NTUC FairPrice Finest occupies 23,000 sq-ft of basement 2.

Facilities
The mall comprises 4 levels and 2 basements. About 30% of the mall is occupied by F&B outlets, with outlets like The Coffee Bean & Tea Leaf (closed and replaced by Gochi-So Shokudo), Starbucks Coffee and other eateries. It also features the first Oki-Machi outlet in Singapore (since closed and taken over by Potato Corner). The mall is also an eco-friendly development with energy efficient mechanical and electrical systems and environmentally-sustainable design features, it was awarded the BCA Green Mark Gold award

Accessibility
Located just next to Fernvale LRT station, visitors can access the mall via the west loop of the Sengkang LRT line. The mall is also served by bus services 50, 163, 163A, 550, 592, 671 and 728. Drivers can reach the mall through nearby expressways such as Tampines Expressway (TPE) and Central Expressway (CTE).

References

External links
 

Shopping malls established in 2014
Shopping malls in Singapore
Singapore Press Holdings
Buildings and structures in Sengkang
Tourist attractions in North-East Region, Singapore
2014 establishments in Singapore
Sengkang
Fernvale, Singapore